The Bride Came C.O.D. is a 1941 American screwball romantic comedy starring James Cagney as an airplane pilot and Bette Davis as a runaway heiress, and directed by William Keighley.  Although the film was publicized as the first screen pairing of Warner Bros.' two biggest stars, they had actually made Jimmy the Gent together in 1934, and had wanted to find another opportunity to work together.

The screenplay was written by Kenneth Earl, M. M. Musselman, and twins Julius J. Epstein and Philip G. Epstein.

Plot
Pilot Steve Collins (James Cagney) agrees to help bandleader Alan Brice (Jack Carson) and heiress Joan Winfield (Bette Davis) elope. Steve then contacts her father Lucius (Eugene Pallette), offering to prevent the marriage and deliver her to him in return for enough money to get out of debt.

Steve tricks Alan into getting off the aircraft, then takes off with Joan. When an irate Joan tries to jump out of the aircraft, Steve sees that she has her parachute on backwards and is forced to crash land near the ghost town of Bonanza. The next morning, they encounter the lone resident, "Pop" Tolliver (Harry Davenport). Joan escapes into an abandoned mine. When Steve follows her, they are trapped by a cave-in. Steve finds a way out, but hides it from Joan on the advice of Pop. Believing that they are going to die, Joan re-examines her frivolous life with great regret. Steve admits he loves her, but when he kisses her, she tastes food on his lips and realizes he has found a way out. They exit the mine to find that Alan has tracked them down, accompanied by a Nevada judge.

Steve does not object when Alan and Joan get married, hiding the fact that Bonanza is in California and therefore the wedding is invalid. The "newlyweds" board another aircraft, but when Joan figures out that they are not really married, she parachutes out to be reunited with Steve.  They get married with her father's approval and honeymoon in Bonanza.

Cast
 James Cagney as Steve Collins
 Bette Davis as Joan Winfield
 Stuart Erwin as Tommy Keenan
 Eugene Pallette as Lucius K. Winfield
 Jack Carson as Alan Brice
 George Tobias as Peewee Dafoe
 William Frawley as Sheriff McGee
 Harry Davenport as "Pop" Tolliver
 Edward Brophy as Hinkle
 Harry Holman as Judge Sobler
 Chick Chandler as First Reporter
 Douglas Kennedy (credited as Keith Douglas) as Second Reporter
 Herbert Anderson as Third Reporter
 William Newell as McGee's Pilot
 William Hopper as Keenan's Pilot
 William Forrest Asst. Dist. Atty. Edwards

Source:

Production

Both Cagney and Davis were interested in changing their movie personas, with Cagney moving away from the gangster-themed roles, while Davis had been seen only in serious dramas, and a romantic comedy was the way. Cagney insisted on having his brother, William, produce the film, with his past success of Captains of the Clouds (1942) proving that he could move from acting to producing. After their work on The Strawberry Blonde (1941), the Cagneys also brought in Julius and Phil Epstein to "invigorate" the script. Davis wasn't the first choice for the Joan Winfield part, as Ann Sheridan, Ginger Rogers and Rosalind Russell were considered before the role was earmarked for Olivia de Havilland. With the backing of Hal Wallis, however, Davis got the coveted role.

Principal photography took place in the Death Valley, California in January 1941, and was problematic as temperatures soared, the script problems were unresolved and one of the stars actually fell into a cactus, with Davis having 45 quills pulled out of her rear.

Aircraft used in the film included examples of contemporary Aeronca, Bellanca, Cessna, Lockheed, Ryan and Waco aircraft, photographed at the Burbank Airport.

Reception
The New York Times dismissed The Bride Came C.O.D. as "a serviceable romp." Reviewer Archer Winston in The New York Post succinctly put it: "Okay, Jimmie and Bette. You've had your fling. Now go back to work." Despite the critical reviews, the film was a popular favorite, and one of the year's top 20 box-office films.

For her part, in her later biographies and interviews, Bette Davis derided The Bride Came C.O.D., sarcastically saying, "it was called a comedy." She would also complain that "all she got out of the film was a derriere full of cactus quills."

A year later, animator Chuck Jones spoofed the film in the Warner Bros. Conrad Cat cartoon, "The Bird Came C.O.D." More recent reviews have described the film as neither "memorable nor funny" but said that the two stars still are worth watching even in a forgettable formula feature.

Radio adaptation
The Bride Came C.O.D. was presented on Lux Radio Theatre on CBS on December 29, 1941. The adaptation starred Bob Hope and Hedy Lamarr.

References
Explanatory notes

Citations

Bibliography

 Cagney, James. Cagney by Cagney. New York: Doubleday, 1976. .
 Chandler, Charlotte. The Girl Who Walked Home Alone: Bette Davis, A Personal Biography. New York: Simon & Schuster, 2006. .
 McCabe, John. Cagney. London: Aurum Press, 2002. .
 McGilligan, Patrick. Cagney: The Actor as Auteur. New York: A. S. Barnes and Co., Inc., 1975. .
 Orriss, Bruce. When Hollywood Ruled the Skies: The Aviation Film Classics of World War II. Hawthorne, California: Aero Associates Inc., 1984. .
 Schickel, Richard and George Perry. Bette Davis: Larger than Life. Philadelphia, Pennsylvania: Running Press, 2009. .
 Sikov, Ed. Dark Victory: The Life of Bette Davis. New York: Henry Holt and Company, 2007. .
 Warren, Doug and James Cagney. Cagney: The Authorized Biography. New York: St. Martin's Press, 1986, First edition 1983. .

External links
 
 
 
 
 TCM article

1941 films
1941 romantic comedy films
1940s screwball comedy films
American aviation films
American black-and-white films
Films directed by William Keighley
Films scored by Max Steiner
1940s English-language films
American romantic comedy films
American screwball comedy films
Films with screenplays by Julius J. Epstein
Films with screenplays by Philip G. Epstein
Warner Bros. films
1940s American films